The Orchid of the Year is a yearly honor given since 1989 to an orchid species native to Germany by the  (AHO, Native Orchid Research Group), a German orchid conservation federation. The choice of orchids follows the endangerment of the species or its habitat due to human pressure.

Orchids of the year

External links 
  Arbeitskreis Heimischer Orchideen (AHO): Orchids of the Year
  Orchideen der Rhön: Orchid of the Year 2006
  AHO Niedersachsen: Orchid of the Year 2007

''This article is based on a translation of the corresponding article in the German Wikipedia.

Orchid organizations
Plant awards
1989 establishments in Germany
Awards established in 1989
German awards
Annual events in Germany